Several forts have been named Fort Beauregard.

Fort Beauregard, in Louisiana
Fort Beauregard (Virginia)
Fort of Beauregard (Besançon), France
Fort Proctor, in Lake Borgne, Louisiana; also known as Fort Beauregard or Beauregard's Castle
Railroad Redoubt, at the Siege of Vicksburg, was also known as Fort Beauregard
Fort Beauregard, fort sited on Philip's Island in South Carolina that Union forces captured at the Battle of Port Royal in 1861